Abu Tahir Ibrahim ibn Nasir al-Dawla was a Hamdanid prince, who along with his brother al-Husayn was the last Hamdanid ruler of Mosul in 989–990. After his defeat at the hand of the Marwanid Kurds, he was killed by the Uqaylid leader Muhammad ibn al-Musayyab, who usurped rule over Mosul for his family.

Life

Ibrahim was a younger son of the founder of the Hamdanid emirate of Mosul, Nasir al-Dawla. Nasir al-Dawla was succeeded by his son Abu Taghlib, who had to confront an uprising by his half-brother Hamdan. Ibrahim apparently sided with Hamdan, for when the latter was defeated in 971 and fled to the Buyid court in Baghdad, Ibrahim joined him. Abu Taghlib's rivalry with the Buyids eventually led to the capture of Mosul by the Buyid Adud al-Dawla in 978, which forced Abu Taghlib to flee to Syria. Ibrahim, however, along with his brother al-Husayn, apparently submitted to the Buyids and entered their service, or were possibly kept as hostages in Baghdad. 

During the 980s, Mosul was threatened by the Kurdish chieftain Badh ibn Dustak. Left without support from Baghdad, the local Buyid governor turned to the local Arab tribes of the Banu Uqayl and the Banu Numayr for assistance. This threatened Buyid control of the area as much as the Kurds, and in 989, the new Buyid emir, Baha al-Dawla, allowed the Hamdanid brothers to return to Mosul, in the hope that their local ties would mobilize opposition against Badh, and keep the Arab tribes reined in. 

The Hamdanids were indeed received with enthusiasm by the local population, to such a degree that they rose in revolt and expelled the Buyid governor from Mosul. The Uqayl backed the Hamdanids, and received control of the towns of Jazirat ibn Umar, Nisibis, and Balad (north of Mosul), in exchange. Exploiting the turmoil, Badh attacked Mosul in the next year, but was defeated and killed by the numerically inferior Uqayl forces in battle near Balad. A Hamdanid counter-offensive followed in the region of Amida against Badh's successor, Abu Ali al-Hasan ibn Marwan, but failed to score any success. Indeed, al-Husayn was taken prisoner during the campaign, only to be released and seek refuge in the Fatimid Caliphate. Ibrahim fled with his son Ali to Uqaylid-held Nisibis, where Muhammad took them prisoner and killed them, usurping rule over Mosul and founding the Uqaylid dynasty.

References

Sources
 
 
 

10th-century births
990 deaths
10th-century Arabs
Hamdanid emirs of Mosul
10th-century executions
People under the Buyid dynasty